The  is a Laotian national costume, worn by men, women, and children.  literally means 'Lao outfit'.

Components
The xout lao is composed of different parts. The style varies between genders from regions to regions, and it often depends on the occasions. For instance, in formal settings men typically wear a white silk Nehru-style jacket with a pha hang with white knee-length socks and dress shoes. Men can also optionally wear a pha biang with checkered patterns on their left shoulders. Women typically wear a sinh matching in colors with a pha biang and a silk suea pat.

References

Further reading

External links
Sinhs (Lao skirt fabric)

See also
Sinh
Pha biang
Suea pat
Chut thai
Raj pattern
Pha hang

Folk costumes
Laotian clothing